Local elections was held in Valenzuela on May 13, 2019 within the Philippine general election. The voters elected elective local posts in the city: the mayor, vice mayor, the two Congressmen (or district representatives), and the councilors, six in each of the city's two legislative districts.

Mayoral and vice mayoral election 
Incumbent mayor Rexlon "Rex" Gatchalian is on his second term as the mayor of Valenzuela. Prior to his election as mayor in 2013, he represented the first district of Valenzuela from 2007 to 2013. It is initially speculated that Rodrigo Duterte's common-law wife Honeylet Avanceña will run for mayor; however, the rumor is debunked by a COMELEC local officer.

Incumbent vice mayor Lorena "Lorie" Natividad-Borja is on her first term as the vice mayor. Prior to her election as vice mayor in 2016, she was a member of the city council representing the second district from 2001–2007 and from 2010–2016.

Congressional election 
The incumbent first district representative is Weslie T. Gatchalian, younger brother to both senator Sherwin T. Gatchalian and incumbent mayor Rexlon T. Gatchalian, is on his first term.

For the second district, incumbent representative Eric Martinez is also on his first term.

Election results
The winners of the congressional, mayor and vice mayor seats of Valenzuela City is determined with the highest number of votes received. These positions are voted separately, so there is a possibility that the winning officials came from the same or different political parties.

Mayoral election
Incumbent mayor is Rexlon "Rex" T. Gatchalian.

Vice Mayoral election
Incumbent vice mayor is Lorena "Lorie" Natividad-Borja.

Congressional elections

First district
Incumbent representative is Weslie Gatchalian.

Second district
Incumbent representative is Eric Martinez.

City council elections

The voters in the city are set to elect six councilors on the district where they are registered. Candidates are voted separately so there are chances where winning candidates will have unequal number of votes and may come from different political parties.

First district

Second district

References

External links 
 Certified List of Candidates (Municipal) - National Capital Region (Third District)
 Certified List of Candidates (District) - National Capital Region

Valenzuela, Metro Manila
2019 Local
May 2019 events in the Philippines
2019 elections in Metro Manila